Nakumatt was a Kenyan supermarket chain. "Nakumatt" is an abbreviation for Nakuru Mattress.

Overview
, Nakumatt had 65 stores in the African Great Lakes countries of Kenya, Uganda, Rwanda and Tanzania. It employed over 5,500, and had gross annual revenue in excess of US$450 million. At that time, it had plans to enter other African countries and to increase the number of stores in the countries where it already had a presence. In October 2017 the company ran out of funds and did not pay rents or wages. 60 stores were closed. As of March 2021, the chain had only one store in operation.

Regional subsidiaries
On 23 August 2008, Nakumatt opened its first store outside Kenya in the Union Trade Center, in Kigali, Rwanda. In June 2009, the first Nakumatt store in Uganda opened on Yusuf Lule Road on Kololo Hill, in central Kampala, the capital city. In November 2010, Nakumatt expanded its footprint in Kampala by acquiring Payless Supermarket, a Ugandan supermarket chain with two stores in the Kampala suburbs of Bugoloobi and Bukoto, bringing the number of stores in Uganda to three. The initial investment in the store in Kololo was approximately US$3 million. The two Payless Supermarket stores cost an estimated US$650,000. Nakumatt plans to expand the new stores at a later date. In February 2016, the retail chain announced plans to open five new stores outside Kenya during the first half of the year.

Branches
 the supermarket chain had five stores in Kenya, including at the following locations: one in Nakuru and four stores in Nairobi. Prestige, Lavington, Embakasi, Mega. The Mega branch on Uhuru Highway now takes a smaller space adjacent to the proposed Carrefour Mega.

Finances
Turnover in 2006 was over US$200 million, up 120% on the previous year. In 2013, turnover (annual gross revenue) was estimated at about US$650 million.

Ownership
Nakumatt was a wholly Kenyan, privately held company, owned by the Atul Shah family. In July 2013, Kenyan print media indicated that the chain planned to sell a 25% stake to yet an unidentified investor and use the funds for regional expansion. After that sale, the Shah family will still remain the largest shareholder in the company.

Safety
The chain has a poor safety record and has faced strong criticism mainly regarding shoppers' and employees' safety. Main case in point is the 2009 Nakumatt fire in which over 29 people lost their lives. However, the management has taken steps to ensure that such accidents do not happen again.

2009 Nakumatt fire
A Nakumatt store in Nairobi suffered a massive fire on 28 January 2009, killing about 29 people.

High-end malls
Nakumatt has played a significant role in the urban development of Kenya's largest and capital city, Nairobi, through the construction of upscale malls throughout the Nairobi area, which include brand name stores, banks, theaters and international eateries.

Sole Sad & Invisible
The website of Nakumatt Holdings Limited was hacked by Iranian hackers called Sole Sad & Invisible. The website as of 31 May 2014 shows a message that the website is under construction. There is a new website www.nakumatt.net

Closure and going out of business
Nakumatt began experiencing serious cash-flow issues in 2016. It was unable to meet its financial obligations to landlords, suppliers, and staff. An administrator was appointed to help it re-gain financial footing. However, in December 2019 the retail chain sold the last six branches to Naivas Supermarkets in a deal that will see the Nakumatt brand completely disappear by the end of 2019. Creditors formally voted to liquidate the company on 7 January 2020

See also

References

External links
2009 Nakumatt Fire
Nakumatt Official Website
Nakumatt Sets Stage To Open 50th Store In August 2014
 Nakumatt In Search of Equity Partner, Plans Expansion Into Western & Southern Africa
 Nakumatt With Eight Stores In Uganda By December 2013
 Nakumatt’s profit drops to Sh305m after high costs

Supermarkets of Kenya
Retail companies established in 1987
Kenyan companies established in 1987